The Dotillidae are a family of crabs with 59 species, nearly half of which are in the genus Ilyoplax. The two genera Scopimera and Dotilla are collectively the sand bubbler crabs, which leave conspicuous collections of sand pellets on sandy beaches across the tropical and subtropical Indo-Pacific.

Genera
Nine genera are currently recognised:
Dotilla Stimpson, 1858
Dotilloplax Tweedie, 1950
Dotillopsis Kemp, 1919
Ilyoplax Stimpson, 1858 
Potamocypoda Tweedie, 1938
Pseudogelasimus Tweedie, 1937
Scopimera De Haan, 1835
Shenius Serène, 1971
Tmethypocoelis Koelbel, 1897

References

Ocypodoidea
Decapod families